Shahrak-e Taleqani (also Romanized as Shahrak-e Ţāleqānī) is a village in Garmdarreh Rural District, in the Central District of Karaj County, Alborz Province, Iran. At the 2006 census, its population was 200, in 44 households. At the most recent census in 2016, the population of the village had decreased to 111 in 35 households; it is the largest village in its rural district.

References 

Karaj County

Populated places in Alborz Province

Populated places in Karaj County